The Roman Catholic Diocese of Chios  is a diocese located on the island of Chios in the Ecclesiastical province of Naxos, Andros, Tinos and Mykonos in Greece.

History
 1400: Established as Diocese of Chios

Diocese of Chios
Bishops of Chios (Roman rite)

Constantino Giustiniani, O.P. (27 Aug 1540 - 1546 Died)
Girolamo Giustiniani, O.P. (15 Dec 1599 - 1604 Resigned)
Marco Giustiniani, O.P. (31 May 1604 - 1640 Died)
Andrea Soffiani (10 Mar 1642 - 1686 Died)
Leonardo Balsarini (Mar 1686 Succeeded - 19 Dec 1698 Resigned)
Tomaso Giustiniani, C.R.M. (28 May 1700 - 22 Jul 1709 Appointed, Bishop of Nebbio)
Philippus Bavestrelli (30 Sep 1720 - 6 Apr 1754 Died)
Giovanni Battista Bavestrelli (16 Sep 1754 - 31 Aug 1772 Appointed, Vicar Apostolic of Constantinople)
Jean Antoine Voricla (12 Jul 1773 - 28 Feb 1785 Died)
Pietro Antonio Craveri, O.F.M. Obs. (19 Dec 1785 - 7 Apr 1788 Confirmed, Bishop of Galtelli-Nuoro)
Nicolao Lorenzo Timoni (15 Sep 1788 - 18 Nov 1812 Died)
Binkentios Coressi (24 Jul 1797 - Did Not Take Effect)
Francesco Saverio Dracopoli (19 Dec 1814 - 1 Aug 1821 Died)
Ignazio Giustiniani (10 May 1829 - 10 Mar 1875 Died)
Andrea Policarpo Timoni (30 Jul 1875 - 13 May 1879 Appointed, Archbishop of Izmir)
Ignazio Nicolaus Giustiniani (13 May 1879 - 26 Oct 1884 Died)
Fedele Abbati (Abati), O.F.M. (23 Jan 1885 - 27 Apr 1890 Resigned)
Dionisio Nicolosi (6 Jun 1890 - 25 Jan 1916 Died)
Nikolaos Charichiopoulos (Harikoupoulos) (3 Jan 1917 - 1 Jul 1939 Died)
 Archbishop Alessandro Guidati (Apostolic Administrator 1939 – 1947.02.22)
 Archbishop Giovanni Battista Filippucci (Apostolic Administrator 1947.05.29 – 1959.11.06)
 Fr. Rocco Dellatolla (Apostolic Administrator 1959 – 1961)
 Archbishop Ioannis Perris (Apostolic Administrator 1961 – 1993)
 Archbishop Nikolaos Printesis (Apostolic Administrator 1993.04.29 – 2021.01.25)
 Archbishop Josif Printezis (Apostolic Administrator 2021.01.25 – present)

See also
Roman Catholicism in Greece

References

Sources
 GCatholic.org
 Catholic Hierarchy

Roman Catholic dioceses in Greece
Religious organizations established in the 1400s
Chios
Roman Catholic dioceses established in the 15th century